assert.h is a header file in the C standard library. It defines the C preprocessor macro  and implements runtime assertion in C.

assert.h is defined in ANSI C as part of the C standard library.

Use
The  macro implements runtime assertion. If the expression within it is false, the macro will print a message to stderr and call abort(), defined in stdlib.h. In ANSI C, the expression in the  macro is defined as signed integer, although any expression that can be implicitly cast to a signed integer may be used. In C99, the  macro explicitly allows any scalar type. Two common uses of the  macro are to assert that a pointer is not null and to ensure that an array index is in-bounds.

Below is a program using the  macro.
#include <assert.h>
int main()
{
    void* pointer = 0;
    assert(pointer);
    return 0;
}

Upon compiling the program and running it, a message similar to the following will be output:
 program: source.c:5: main: Assertion 'pointer' failed.
 Aborted (core dumped)

The definition of the  macro changes depending on the definition of another macro, . The use of  may affect the overall behavior of a program if one or more  statements contain side effects, as these statements are not evaluated.

The  macro does not include an error message.

static_assert
The  macro, added in C++11, serves a similar purpose to the  macro. Unlike the  macro,  runs at compile-time rather than at runtime. The original implementation used template hacks. The  macro takes in a constant expression that can be converted into a Boolean and a string literal; if the expression fails, the string literal is returned, otherwise, the macro has no effect. In C++17, this assertion failure message was made optional, and the subsequent message is omitted if not specified.

Gnulib defines  for platforms that do not use C11 and does not require  to be included.

References

Citations

Bibliography
 
 
 
 
 
 
 
 
 
 
 

C standard library headers